Brenner tumors are an uncommon subtype of the surface epithelial-stromal tumor group of ovarian neoplasms. The majority are benign, but some can be malignant.

They are most frequently found incidentally on pelvic examination or at laparotomy. Brenner tumours very rarely can occur in other locations, including the testes.

Presentation
On gross pathological examination, they are solid, sharply circumscribed and pale yellow-tan in colour.  90% are unilateral (arising in one ovary, the other is unaffected). Borderline and malignant Brenner tumours are possible but each are rare.

Diagnosis

Histologically, there are nests of transitional epithelial (urothelial) cells with longitudinal nuclear grooves (coffee bean nuclei) lying in abundant fibrous stroma.

Also recall that the "coffee bean nuclei" are the nuclear grooves exceptionally pathognomonic to the sex cord stromal tumor, the ovarian granulosa cell tumor, with the fluid-filled spaces Call–Exner bodies between the granulosa cells.

Similar conditions
Transitional cell carcinoma is an even rarer entity, in which neoplastic transitional epithelial cells similar to transitional cell carcinoma of the bladder are seen in the ovary, without the characteristic stromal/epithelial pattern of a Brenner tumour.

Histologically, Leydig cell tumors of the testes and ovarian stromal Leydig cell tumors (ovarian hyperandrogenism and virilization) both have characteristic Reinke crystals. The same crystals were also noted under high power view in Brenner tumors.

Eponym
It is named for Fritz Brenner (1877–1969), a German surgeon who characterized it in 1907. The term "Brenner tumor" was first used by Robert Meyer, in 1932.

Additional images

References

External links 

 
Histology at University of Utah

Ovarian cancer